Kapri may refer to

 Kapri (singer), Canadian singer
 Kapri Bibbs, former American football running back
 Vinod Kapri, Indian filmmaker
 Bill Kahan Kapri, Kodak Black, American rapper 
 Bhuwan Chandra Kapri Indian politician
 Kapri, list of Power Rangers Ninja Storm characters